Antheliaceae is a liverwort family in the order Jungermanniales. It contains a single genus, Anthelia.

References

External links 

Jungermanniales
Jungermanniales genera